Estonia competed at the 2004 Summer Olympics in Athens, Greece, from 13 to 29 August 2004. This was the nation's ninth appearance at the Summer Olympics.

The Estonian Olympic Committee sent a total of 42 athletes, 31 men and 11 women, competing only in 11 different sports. Sixteen athletes had competed in Sydney, including three Olympic medalists: decathlon champion Erki Nool, and judoka and bronze medalists Aleksei Budõlin and Indrek Pertelson. Rower Jüri Jaanson participated in his fifth Olympics under two different banners (the other one with the Soviet Union) as the most experienced member of the contingent. Discus thrower Eha Rünne, aged 41, was the oldest athlete of the team, while long-distance freestyle swimmer Jelena Petrova was the youngest at age 15. Claiming the nation's first ever gold medal in athletics, Nool was appointed by the Estonian Olympic Committee to become the nation's flag bearer in the opening ceremony.

Estonia left Athens with the same number of medals (one silver and two bronze) collected from the previous games, but failed to earn a single gold for the first time in history since the break-up of the Soviet Union. After finishing farther from the podium in four consecutive Olympics, Jaanson ended his medal drought by taking home the silver in the men's single sculls. Two bronze medals were awarded to discus thrower Aleksander Tammert and heavyweight judoka Indrek Pertelson, who managed to repeat it from Sydney.

Medalists

Athletics

Estonian athletes have so far achieved qualifying standards in the following athletics events (up to a maximum of 3 athletes in each event at the 'A' Standard, and 1 at the 'B' Standard).

Men
Track & road events

Field events

Combined events – Decathlon

Women
Track & road events

Field events

Cycling

Road

Mountain biking

Judo

Estonia has qualified two judoka

Rowing

Men

Qualification Legend: FA=Final A (medal); FB=Final B (non-medal); FC=Final C (non-medal); FD=Final D (non-medal); FE=Final E (non-medal); FF=Final F (non-medal); SA/B=Semifinals A/B; SC/D=Semifinals C/D; SE/F=Semifinals E/F; R=Repechage

Sailing

Men

M = Medal race; OCS = On course side of the starting line; DSQ = Disqualified; DNF = Did not finish; DNS= Did not start; RDG = Redress given

Shooting 

Men

Swimming

Estonian swimmers earned qualifying standards in the following events (up to a maximum of 2 swimmers in each event at the A-standard time, and 1 at the B-standard time):

Men

Women

Tennis

Triathlon

Estonia's first appearance in the Olympic triathlon resulted in a twenty-first-place finish for the nation's sole competitor in the sport.

Wrestling 

Men's Greco-Roman

See also
 Estonia at the 2004 Summer Paralympics

References

External links
 Official Report of the XXVIII Olympiad
 EOK – Ateena 2004 

Nations at the 2004 Summer Olympics
2004
Summer Olympics